Marisa Elizabeth Antonio Gonzales (born 5 May 1995) is a Salvadoran footballer who plays as a midfielder. She has been a member of the El Salvador women's national team.

International career
Antonio represented El Salvador at the 2012 CONCACAF Women's U-17 Championship qualifying. She capped at senior level during the 2013 Central American Games.

See also
List of El Salvador women's international footballers

References

1995 births
Living people
Salvadoran women's footballers
Women's association football midfielders
El Salvador women's international footballers
Central American Games competitors